Apti Movlidovich Akhyadov (born 24 August 1993) is a Russian footballer. He plays as a striker or right midfielder.

Career
Akhyadov made his professional debut for FC Terek Grozny on 13 July 2010 in the Russian Cup game against FC Luch-Energiya Vladivostok. He made his Russian Football Premier League on 21 August 2015 for FC Terek Grozny in a game against FC Dynamo Moscow.

On 26 July 2018, he joined FC Anzhi Makhachkala on loan for the 2018–19 season.

On 2 July 2019, he joined FC Chayka Peschanokopskoye on loan. The loan was terminated by mutual consent on 19 August 2019.

On 23 January 2020 he signed a 1.5-year contract with FC Tom Tomsk.

Career statistics

Club

External links
 
  Player page on the official FC Terek Grozny website

References

1993 births
People from Gudermes
Living people
Russian footballers
Association football forwards
Russia youth international footballers
FC Akhmat Grozny players
PFC Spartak Nalchik players
FC Anzhi Makhachkala players
FC Tom Tomsk players
FC Kyran players
Russian Premier League players
Russian First League players
Russian Second League players
Kazakhstan First Division players
Russian expatriate footballers
Expatriate footballers in Kazakhstan
FC Chayka Peschanokopskoye players
Sportspeople from Chechnya